Laura Igaune (10 February 1988) is a Latvian athlete who specializes in the discus throw and hammer throw. Igaune achieved her best result in hammer throw of 71.61 m on April 19, 2019, in Durham, NC United States, which is the Latvian national record. Her personal record in discus throw is 51.17 m.

References

External links

1988 births
People from Aizkraukle
Living people
Latvian female hammer throwers
Latvian female discus throwers
Athletes (track and field) at the 2020 Summer Olympics
Olympic athletes of Latvia